Ricky (January 28, 1977 – December 13, 1992), Robert D (January 27, 1978 – October 20, 2000) and Randy Ray (born June 3, 1979) were three hemophiliac brothers who were diagnosed with HIV in 1986 due to blood transfusions.

Biography
Ricky, Robert, and Randy were hemophiliacs who contracted HIV from blood transfusions when they were less than 8 years old. Born to Arcadia, Florida natives Louise and Clifford Ray, the family was exiled from Arcadia as community members feared contracting the disease. Memorial Elementary, in DeSoto County, would not allow them to attend school due to their diagnosis. They became the subject of a federal court battle against the DeSoto County School Board to allow the children to attend public school despite their diagnosis. The Rays were victorious in their legal battle, winning a $1.1 million settlement. They were allowed to go back to school, but the Ray home was burned down a week after the 1987 decision, forcing the family to leave Arcadia.

After the arson of their home, the Ray Family settled in nearby Sarasota.  The brothers attended Gocio Elementary School in spite of opposition from groups like  Citizens Against AIDS.

Ricky Ray became an activist in the fight against AIDS. In 1992, he allowed camera crews to document his declining health and stated he wanted America to see what AIDS did to people. President Bill Clinton spoke to him and thanked him for his work raising awareness on AIDS. Ricky Ray died in 1992 at age 15. Prior to his death, he made headlines by planning to marry his 17-year-old girlfriend, but a judge blocked the wedding because of his age. 

Robert died of AIDS related causes in 2000 at the age of 22. Shortly thereafter, their father, Clifford Ray, attempted suicide but survived. 

Randy Ray married in 2001 and lives in Orlando, Florida. He manages his HIV through medication.

See also
Contaminated haemophilia blood products
Ryan White

Sources
Donnelly, John. "Ricky Ray loses AIDS battle". The Miami Herald. 1992/12/14:
Craig Basse and Mike Brassfield. "Robert Ray, 22, succumbs to longtime AIDS struggle". St. Petersburg Times. October 21, 2000
Buckley, Stephen. "Slow change of heart". St. Petersburg Times. September 2, 2001
Thomas, Mike "Arson Cause Of Fire At Rays -- Boys Start School Today".   Orlando Sentinel  September 23, 1987

References

External links
The Ray Brothers

Trios
HIV/AIDS activists
AIDS-related deaths in Florida
Recipients of contaminated haemophilia blood products
1987 in Florida
1987 crimes in the United States
People from Arcadia, Florida
People from Sarasota, Florida